Colin Moffat Stockton (19 July 1881 – 1931) was an English professional footballer who played as an outside right. He made appearances in the English Football League for Leeds City.

References

1881 births
1931 deaths
English footballers
Association football wingers
Ellesmere Port Town F.C. players
Wrexham A.F.C. players
Chester City F.C. players
Chelsea F.C. players
Leeds City F.C. players
English Football League players